This article contains information about the literary events and publications of 1938.

Events
January
The John Dos Passos trilogy U.S.A. is published, containing his novels The 42nd Parallel (1930), 1919 (1932), and The Big Money (1936).
Samuel Beckett is stabbed in the chest in Paris and nearly killed.
February 21 – The gay American writer and composer Paul Bowles marries the lesbian American writer Jane Auer at a Reformed Church in Manhattan.
March 7 – Samuel Beckett's first completed novel Murphy is published in London.
July 11 – The first live drama adaptation in Orson Welles' The Mercury Theatre on the Air series on CBS Radio in the United States is broadcast: Bram Stoker's Dracula.
August – Muslims protest in London against passages they see as disrespectful to their religion in H. G. Wells' A Short History of the World (1922).
September 13 – The first production in Britain of a play by Bertolt Brecht, Mrs Carrar's Rifles, opens at the Unity Theatre, London.
October 30 – Orson Welles' radio adaptation of The War of the Worlds (with script by Howard Koch) is broadcast in The Mercury Theatre on the Air series.
December 24 – Jorge Luis Borges is injured in an accident and develops blood poisoning. While recovering the following year he will write the first short story in his later characteristic style.
Uncertain dates
The first complete performance of both parts of Goethe's Faust (1808/32) is given at the Goetheanum in Dornach, Switzerland.
The avant-garde musician and theoretician Pierre Schaeffer begins his writing career as an essayist for a number of French musical journals.

New books

Fiction
Margery Allingham – The Fashion in Shrouds
Eric Ambler
Cause for Alarm
Epitaph for a Spy
Vladimir Bartol – Alamut
 Anthony Berkeley – Not to Be Taken
Elizabeth Bowen – The Death of the Heart
Lynn Brock – The Silver Sickle Case
Edgar Rice Burroughs – Tarzan and the Forbidden City
Taylor Caldwell – Dynasty of Death
Victor Canning – Mr. Finchley Goes to Paris
John Dickson Carr
The Four False Weapons, Being the Return of Bencolin
To Wake the Dead
The Crooked Hinge
The Judas Window (as Carter Dickson)
Death in Five Boxes (as Carter Dickson)
Peter Cheyney 
 Can Ladies Kill?
 The Urgent Hangman
Agatha Christie
Hercule Poirot's Christmas
Appointment with Death
Albert Cohen – Nailcruncher
 Freeman Wills Crofts 
Antidote to Venom
The End of Andrew Harrison
René Daumal – A Night of Serious Drinking (La Grande Beuverie)
 Cecil Day-Lewis – The Beast Must Die
John Dos Passos – The Big Money (completing the U.S.A. trilogy)
Daphne du Maurier – Rebecca
Lawrence Durrell – The Black Book
Mircea Eliade – Marriage in Heaven (Nuntă în cer)
William Faulkner – The Unvanquished
Rachel Field – All This and Heaven Too
C. S. Forester
A Ship of the Line
Flying Colours
Anthony Gilbert – Treason in My Breast
Julien Gracq – The Castle of Argol (Au château d'Argol)
Robert Graves – Count Belisarius
Graham Greene – Brighton Rock
Walter Greenwood 
 Only Mugs Work
 The Secret Kingdom
Xavier Herbert – Capricornia
Robin Hyde – The Godwits Fly (semi-autobiographical)
Michael Innes – Lament for a Maker
Margaret Kennedy – The Midas Touch
Alan Kennington – She Died Young
Emilio Lussu – Un anno sull'altopiano
C. S. Lewis – Out of the Silent Planet
Norman Lindsay – Age of Consent
 Ngaio Marsh 
 Artists in Crime
 Death in a White Tie
Henry Miller – Tropic of Capricorn
Gladys Mitchell – St Peter's Finger
Vladimir Nabokov
The Gift (Дар)
Invitation to a Beheading (Приглашение на казнь; serialization concludes)
 E. Phillips Oppenheim – The Colossus of Arcadia
Kate O'Brien – Pray for the Wanderer
John O'Hara – Hope of Heaven
Ellery Queen
The Devil to Pay
The Four of Hearts
Graciliano Ramos – Vidas Secas (Barren Lives)
Ayn Rand – Anthem
Marjorie Kinnan Rawlings – The Yearling
Clayton Rawson – Death from a Top Hat
Joseph Roth – The Emperor's Tomb
Jean-Paul Sartre – Nausea (La Nausée)
Georges Simenon – The Man Who Watched the Trains Go By (L'Homme qui regardait passer les trains)
Esphyr Slobodkina – Caps for Sale: A Tale of a Peddler, Some Monkeys and Their Monkey Business
Eleanor Smith – The Spanish House
Howard Spring – My Son, My Son
John Steinbeck – The Long Valley
Rex Stout – Too Many Cooks
Cecil Street 
 The Bloody Tower
 Death at Low Tide
  Invisible Weapons
Kressmann Taylor – Address Unknown (short story)
Phoebe Atwood Taylor
The Annulet of Gilt
Banbury Bog
The Cut Direct (as by Alice Tilton)
Murder at the New York World's Fair (as by Freeman Dana)
B. Traven – The Bridge in the Jungle
S. S. Van Dine – The Gracie Allen Murder Case
 – Na krásné samotě
Henry Wade – Released for Death
Winifred Watson – Miss Pettigrew Lives for a Day
Evelyn Waugh – Scoop
T. H. White – The Sword in the Stone
Gale Wilhelm – Torchlight to Valhalla
Francis Brett Young – Dr. Bradley Remembers

Children and young people
Claire Huchet Bishop – The Five Chinese Brothers
Enid Blyton – The Secret Island
Eleanor Graham – The Children Who Lived in a Barn
Joan Kahn – "Ladies and Gentlemen," said the Ringmaster
Eric Knight – Lassie Come-Home
Marjorie Kinnan Rawlings – The Yearling
Kate Seredy – The White Stag
Noel Streatfeild – The Circus Is Coming
T. H. White – The Sword in the Stone
John F. C. Westerman – John Wentley Takes Charge (first in the John Wentley series of three books)
Ursula Moray Williams – Adventures of the Little Wooden Horse

Drama
Jean Anouilh – Thieves' Carnival (Le Bal des Voleurs)
Robert Ardrey – Casey Jones
Paul Claudel – L'Histoire de Tobie et de Sara (The History of Tobit and Sara, first version)
M. J. Farrell – Spring Meeting
Patrick Hamilton – Gaslight
 H.M. Harwood – The Innocent Party
Esther McCracken – Quiet Wedding
Kaj Munk – Han sidder ved Smeltediglen (He sits by the melting pot)
 Michael Pertwee –  Death on the Table
J. B. Priestley – When We Are Married
Robert E. Sherwood – Abe Lincoln in Illinois
Dodie Smith – Dear Octopus
Stephen Spender – Trial of a Judge
Lesley Storm – Tony Draws a Horse
Arnold Sundgaard
Spirochete: A History
 with Marc Connelly – Everywhere I Roam
Rodolfo Usigli – El gesticulador
Theodore Ward – Big White Fog
Thornton Wilder – Our Town
Emlyn Williams – The Corn is Green
Tennessee Williams – Not About Nightingales (written; first performed 1998)
W. B. Yeats – Purgatory

Poetry

Alfred Kreymborg – The Planets: A Modern Allegory (radio play in verse)
Mary Pettibone Poole – A Glass Eye at a Keyhole

Non-fiction
Crane Brinton – The Anatomy of Revolution
Hall Caine (died 1931) – Life of Christ
Cyril Connolly – Enemies of Promise
Geoffrey Faber – The Romance of a Bookshop 1904–1938
Robert Newton Flew – Jesus and His Church. A study of the idea of the Ecclesia in the New Testament
Edgar Innes Fripp (died 1931) – Shakespeare, Man and Artist
Elie Halévy – The Era of Tyrannies
Agnes Hunt – This Is My Life (autobiography of pioneer orthopedic nurse)
C. L. R. James – The Black Jacobins: Toussaint L'Ouverture and the San Domingo Revolution
Claude Scudamore Jarvis – Desert and Delta. An account of modern Egypt
Jomo Kenyatta – Facing Mount Kenya
Anne Morrow Lindbergh – Listen! The Wind
Robert McAlmon – Being Geniuses Together, 1920–1930
Thomas Mann – The Coming Victory of Democracy
George Orwell – Homage to Catalonia
Nichita Smochină – Republica Moldovenească a Sovietelor (The Moldavian Republic of Soviets)
Derek A. Traversi – An Approach to Shakespeare
H.G. Wells – World Brain
Virginia Woolf – Three Guineas

Births
January 2 – Hans Herbjørnsrud, Norwegian short story writer
January 5 – Ngũgĩ wa Thiong'o (also known as James Ngigi), Kenyan novelist
January 6 – Mario Rodríguez Cobos ("Silo"), Argentine author and spiritualist (died 2010)
January 20 – Liz Calder, English publisher and editor
February 7 – Andrea Newman, English novelist and screenwriter (died 2019)
February 9 – Jovette Marchessault, French Canadian writer and artist (died 2012)
February 12
Judy Blume, American children's author
Tor Obrestad, Norwegian novelist, poet and documentary writer (died 2020)
February 22 – Ishmael Reed, American poet, essayist and novelist
March 1 – Michael Kurland, American author of sci-fi and detective fiction
March 14 – Eleanor Bron, English humorous writer and actress
March 24 – Ian Hamilton, English critic, biographer and poet (died 2001)
March 27 – Hansjörg Schneider, Swiss novelist (died 2016)
April 20 – Chiung Yao, Taiwanese romance novelist
April 25 – John Nagenda, Ugandan writer and sportsman (died 2023)
April 30 – Larry Niven, American sci-fi author
May 13 – Norma Klein, American author (died 1989)
May 15 – Nancy Garden, American author (died 2014)
May 16 – Marco Aurelio Denegri, Peruvian literature critic, television host and sexologist (died 2018)
May 25
Raymond Carver, American short-story writer and poet (died 1988)
Margaret Forster, English novelist and biographer (died 2016)
May 26 – Lyudmila Petrushevskaya, Russian novelist and playwright
June 5 – M. K. Wren (Martha Kay Renfroe), American novelist (died 2016)
June 16 – Joyce Carol Oates, American novelist
June 24 – Lawrence Block, American crime fiction writer
June 26 – Maria Velho da Costa, Portuguese writer (died 2020)
July 15 – Josephine Cox, English novelist (died 2020)
July 19
Nicholas Bethell, English historian and politician (died 2007)
Dom Moraes, Indian poet and columnist (died 2004)
Tom Raworth, English poet (died 2017)
Mary-Kay Wilmers, American-born editor
July 28 – Robert Hughes, Australian critic and historian (died 2012)
August 15 – Janusz Zajdel, Polish writer (died 1985)
August 21 – Mudrooroo (Colin Johnson), Australian novelist (died 2019)
September 3 – Caryl Churchill, English dramatist
September 12 – Richard Booth, Welsh bookseller (died 2019)
September 15 – Charles L. Mee, American dramatist
September 18 – Poornachandra Tejaswi, Kannada writer (died 2007)
September 19 – Keorapetse Kgositsile, South African Poet Laureate (died 2018)
October 12 – Anne Perry (Juliet Marion Hulme), English historical novelist 
October 13 – Hugo Young, English journalist (died 2003)
October 17 – Les Murray, Australian poet (died 2019)
October 19 – Allan Massie, Singapore-born Scottish writer
November 3 – Terrence McNally, American playwright (died 2020)
November 4 – Daniel Snowman, English non-fiction writer and historian
December 9 – Willi Glasauer, German artist and illustrator
December 14 – Leonardo Boff (Genézio Darci Boff), Brazilian philosopher and theologian
December 21 – Frank Moorhouse, Australian journalist, author and screenwriter (died 2022)
December 31 – Basudeb Dasgupta, Bengali novelist (died 2005)
unknown date – Gabriel Ruhumbika, Tanzanian novelist

Deaths
January 4 – Paola Drigo, Italian writer (born 1876)
January 16 – Sarat Chandra Chattopadhyay (Sarat Chandra Chattergee), Bengali novelist (born 1876)
January 19 – Branislav Nušić, Serbian novelist and dramatist (born 1864)
January 29 – Armando Palacio Valdés, Spanish novelist and critic (born 1853)
February 13 – Momčilo Nastasijević, Serbian poet, novelist and dramatist (born 1894)
March 6 – Eva Allen Alberti, American dramatics teacher (born 1856)
March 27 — Helen M. Winslow, American editor, author and publisher (born 1851)
March 31 – Willem Kloos, Dutch poet and critic (born 1859)
April 19 – Sir Henry Newbolt, English poet (born 1862)
April 21 – Lady Ottoline Morrell, English literary hostess (born 1873)
May 26 – James Forbes, Canadian American dramatist and screenwriter (born 1871)
June 9 – Ovid Densusianu, Romanian poet, philologist, and literary historian (born 1873)
June 26
James Weldon Johnson, American politician, poet and activist (born 1871)
E. V. Lucas, English essayist and biographer, 70
July 21 – Owen Wister, American Western fiction writer and historian (born 1860)
August 7 – Konstantin Stanislavski, Russian theatre director (born 1863)
August 26 – Millosh Gjergj Nikolla, Albanian poet and writer (tuberculosis, born 1911)
September 15 – Thomas Wolfe, American novelist (tuberculosis, born 1900)
October 3 – Olivia Shakespear, British novelist, playwright and patron of the arts (born 1863)
October 27 – Lascelles Abercrombie, English poet and literary critic (born 1881)
December 13 – Virginia Frazer Boyle, American author and poet (born 1863)
December 23 – Robert Herrick, American realist novelist (born 1868)
December 25 – Karel Čapek, Czech science fiction author and dramatist (pneumonia, born 1890)
December 27 – Osip Mandelstam, Russian poet and essayist (in detention, born 1891)

Awards
Carnegie Medal for children's literature: Noel Streatfeild, The Circus Is Coming
Hawthornden Prize – David Jones, In Parenthesis
James Tait Black Memorial Prize for fiction: C. S. Forester, A Ship of the Line and Flying Colours
James Tait Black Memorial Prize for biography: Sir Edmund Chambers, Samuel Taylor Coleridge
Newbery Medal for children's literature: Kate Seredy, The White Stag
Newdigate prize: Michael Thwaites
Nobel Prize in literature: Pearl S. Buck
Pulitzer Prize for Drama: Thornton Wilder, Our Town
Pulitzer Prize for Poetry: Marya Zaturenska, Cold Morning Sky
Pulitzer Prize for the Novel: John Phillips Marquand, The Late George Apley

References

 
Years of the 20th century in literature